Carlos Salamanca was the defending champion, but he lost to Júlio César Campozano already in the first round.
Giovanni Lapentti, who received wildcard into the singles main draw, won this tournament, by defeating João Souza 2–6, 6–3, 6–4 in the final.

Seeds

Draw

Finals

Top half

Bottom half

References
 Main Draw
 Qualifying Draw

Cerveza Club Premium Open - Singles
2010 Singles